Larwood is a surname. Notable people with the surname include:

Harold Larwood (1904–1995), British cricketer
Jacob Larwood (1826–1918), Dutch author
Marek Larwood (born 1976), English comedian and actor

See also
Harwood (name)
Lapwood
Larwood Bridge